Bhal Padri (Kashmiri; Bal Padri) is a hill station situated above a group of small valleys covered with dense forest located in the Changa, Bhalessa. area of Doda district. Rivulets and streams flow through this valley.

Etymology
The name Bhal Padri is derived from the words, Bhal, which stands for Bhalessa, and Padri, the name of a nearby location popularly known as Padri Pass or Padri Top.

About
Bhal Padri village is located to the northeast of Padri Pass, the highest point on the Bhaderwah-Chamba road. Bhalessa is the nearest village on the northwestern side. People residing there belong to the Gujjar community and live in mud houses without electricity. They use solar-powered lights.

Tourism

The landscape around it is characterised by streams flowing through meadows, surrounded dense forest. The area is popular for trekking, as the town of Bhaderwah is located only  to the southwest.

Route
It has been called the connecting link between Bhaderwah and Bhalessa. While not connected directly to any road, some nearby roads include the Bhaderwah-Chamba road and the Gandoh-Khilotran road. The Bhaderwah-Chamba road at Padri leads to a path by which one may reach Bhal Padri after a  walk.

The route starts from the nearest airport and provincial headquarters at Jammu.

The road starts from Jammu—Batote (via NH1A), changing route from Batote—Thathri (via NH244), turning right near Thathri-Kishtwar Bridge towards Thathri—Khilotran Highway till the Khilotran area of Gandoh Bhalessa, where a footpath leads towards Bhal Padri.

Notes

References

Doda district
Chenab Valley
Tourist attractions in Doda district